Reid Burgess Lennan (August 17, 1920 – February 1979) was an American football offensive lineman in the National Football League for the Washington Redskins.  He also played in the All-America Football Conference for the Los Angeles Dons.

1920 births
1979 deaths
Players of American football from Baltimore
American football offensive linemen
Washington Redskins players
Los Angeles Dons players
Wilmington Clippers players